Babar pur is the area surrounded by Yamuna Vihar in north, Maujpur in west, Seelampur in south and Chhajjupur in east.  It is situated in the region of North Shahdara of Delhi. It is connected to Main 100 feet road to Ashok Nagar. It is located near Ghaziabad-Loni Border.

Educational institutions
 Maladevi School, Babarpur, Shahdara, Delhi - 110032

Transport
There is very good connectivity of roads as well as of metro rail. 100 feet road connecting Babarpur to Ghaziabad, while Asha Ram Tyagi Marg/Jafrabad Main Road connects Babarpur to G T Road on the south & to wazirabad Road on the north. Babarpur has its own bus terminal, known as Babarpur Bus Terminal. There is an excellent facility of buses, auto-rickshaws, tempos, electric rickshaws & cycle rickshaws. Now Babarpur has its own metro, Maujpur - Babarpur metro station on the Pink line , situated near Shamshan Ghat. In addition to that, Shahdara metro station & Seelampur metro station are also within 1.5 kilometers from Babarpur Bus Terminal.

Economics
Babarpur is famous for naturopathy, Su-Jok, Acupressure, Yoga Clinic, and automobile shops which includes Two Wheeler Like Bajaj, TVS, Hero Honda, Mahindra, Honda, Hyundai, Battery Fitted Scooter, and mopeds.
VERMA TENT HOUSE BUDH BAZAR ROAD ( SINCE 1982 )
Verma Wedding and Events Planner in Babarpur
Shakun & Dwarka Fashion, the final destination for women ready-made garments, is situated here.
Nearest Malls - Cross River mall, Pacific Mall are nearest located malls to Babarpur.
Nearest Markets -Teliwara, Chota Bazar, Rohtas Nagar, Maujpur, etc.
Hira Sweets, the famous shop for Balushahi is also located in Babarpur.
Famous Mayarani Dharamshala in Hariom Gali Babarpur.
Anup Vatika, the famous farmhouse located in Nahar Road, Babarpur.
Shiv Mandir is situated at 100 feet road, Babarpur. It is a famous old mandir.

References

Neighbourhoods in Delhi